Luigi Alfredo Giovanni Sacco (born February 19, 1943), known professionally as Lou Christie, is an American pop and soft rock singer-songwriter known for several hits in the 1960s, including his 1966 US chart-topper "Lightnin' Strikes" and 1969 UK number-two "I'm Gonna Make You Mine".

Biography

Early life and career 
Christie was born Luigi Alfredo Giovanni Sacco on February 19, 1943, in Glenwillard, Pennsylvania, and grew up in suburban Pittsburgh. While attending Moon Area High School, he studied music and voice, served as student conductor of the choir and sang solos at holiday concerts. His teacher, Frank Cummings, wanted him to pursue a career in classical music, but Sacco wanted to cut a record to get on American Bandstand. At age 15 he met and befriended Twyla Herbert, a classically trained musician 20 years his senior, who became his regular songwriting partner and wrote hundreds of songs with him over the next 30 years until her death in 2009. Sacco performed with several vocal groups and between 1959 and 1962 released several records on small Pittsburgh labels, achieving a local hit with "The Jury" by Lugee & The Lions (a group consisting of Sacco, Twyla Herbert's daughter Shirley, and two others) released on the Robbee label. After graduating from high school in 1961, Sacco traveled to New York City and worked as a session vocalist.

In 1962, Sacco approached Nick Cenci with some demo tapes. One of the first things Cenci did was change the name Lugee Alfredo Giovanni Sacco to Lou Christie. Cenci told Sacco that there was only one great Italian singer and that he had to change his name.  Sacco's father liked the name change, because it had "Christ" in it.

Cenci liked Sacco's falsetto voice and suggested that he listen to the Four Seasons' recent hit "Sherry". Sacco and Herbert used the song as a model to write an original song called "The Gypsy Cried". Cenci produced a recording of Sacco performing the song at Gateway Studio in Pittsburgh and initially released it on his own C & C label as a single in 1962, credited to "Lou Christie," the name Sacco used thereafter. The name "Lou Christie" was chosen by C & C Records, and "The Gypsy Cried" was credited to "Lou Christie" before they had consulted with Sacco about the name.

"The Gypsy Cried" became a regional hit, selling 30,000 copies in Pittsburgh. Cenci contacted Morris Levy of Roulette Records, saying that he had a hit that needed national distribution. Levy released the single on Roulette, but initially nothing happened.  Airplay slowly spread across the country, and "The Gypsy Cried" reached number 24 on the Billboard Hot 100 chart, selling over one million copies.  Cenci produced additional recording sessions for Christie in 1963 that generated two more hits. "Two Faces Have I", his second million-seller, reached number 6 on the chart in June 1963. Roulette released an album of 12 Lou Christie / Twyla Herbert songs in 1963 that reached 124 on the Billboard 200. With those hits, Christie joined Dick Clark's Caravan of Stars Tour, alongside Diana Ross, Brian Hyland, and others.

During this pre-Army phase of his career, the female vocalists featured on Christie's records were The Tammys, a trio from Pleasantville, Venango County, Pennsylvania. Christie and Herbert wrote the single "Egyptian Shumba" for the group, and although it was not a hit, it became a cult favorite in the Northern Soul scene in the early 1970s.

Christie made numerous TV appearances on Where the Action Is (1965–1967), and also appeared on American Bandstand and The Buddy Deane Show (1962–1964) in Baltimore.  He also sang with Del Shannon.

Christie's third Roulette release, "How Many Teardrops" (written by Milan), stalled at No. 46 as Christie's career was temporarily derailed by his induction into the US Army. Christie did not have another charting single for two and a half years.  Despite threats from Roulette owner Morris Levy, Christie managed to get out of his contract with the company.

"Lightnin' Strikes" and "Rhapsody In The Rain":  1965–1966 
Christie's career was quickly re-established after his discharge from the military when he signed with the MGM label.  MGM reportedly disliked Christie's first single for the label, the Christie-Herbert song "Lightnin' Strikes". But Christie's new management promoted the record in California, and when it gained some traction (eventually reaching No. 2 on KHJ the last two weeks of 1965), MGM released it. "Lightnin' Strikes" reached #1 in the US on Christie's 23rd birthday on February 19, 1966, entered the UK Top 20, becoming his first hit in that country, and peaked at #1 in Canada. The song featured his signature falsetto and included a female chorus (Bernadette Carroll, Denise Ferri, and Peggy Santiglia) shouting "Stop!" in counterpoint to the lead vocal:
When I see lips begging to be kissed (Stop!)
I can't stop, (Stop!) no I can't stop myself! (Stop! Stop!)

Christie's next release in the spring of 1966, "Rhapsody in the Rain", featured a  melody inspired by Tchaikovsky's "Romeo and Juliet",  telling of a teenager's memory of his sexual experience in the back seat of a car during a rainstorm as the windshield wipers made a rhythmic sound of "together, together".  Later, after the romance ends, the wipers seem to say "never, never". Many radio stations banned the song after hearing the opening lyrics:

Baby, the raindrops play for me
Our lovely rhapsody, 'cause on our first date
We were makin' out in the rain.
And in this car, our love went much too far
It was exciting as thunder
Tonight I wonder, where you are?

MGM insisted on a re-recorded version that toned down the lyrical content. The third and fourth lines were changed to:

We fell in love in the rain
And in this car, love came like a falling star

Despite the edited version, many radio stations instead played two older songs re-released by other labels for which Christie had once recorded: "Outside the Gates of Heaven" (on Co & Ce Records) peaked at #45, while "Big Time" (on Colpix Records) hit #95.  All three singles hit nationally within three weeks of one another, in March 1966, while "Lightnin' Strikes" was falling down the chart.  However, later records for MGM, including "If My Car Could Only Talk" arranged and produced by Jack Nitzsche, failed to chart.

Resurgence: 1967–1970 
in the late 1960s, after being dropped by MGM, Christie had an unfruitful stint with Columbia Records. He then joined Buddah Records in 1968, a move prompted by his business manager Stan Polley and bubblegum music record producer Tony Romeo.  He had a surprise Wall of Sound constant uptempo hit "I'm Gonna Make You Mine", which Romeo wrote, in the early autumn of 1969. Helped by backing vocalists Linda Scott, Lesley Gore, and Valerie Simpson, and by two promotional videos distinctly different from each other, the song peaked at No. 10 in the US, but climbed to No. 2 on the UK Singles Chart and thus became his biggest hit there.   

A follow up, "She Sold Me Magic", never released as a single in the US, charted in the UK where it peaked at No. 25,  and in Japan where it reached No.1.  It was later covered by Elton John. Conversely, "Are You Getting Any Sunshine?" only charted in America, where it reached No. 73.

Later career: 1971–present 

Christie spent the early 1970s between London and New York City. In 1971 he released a concept album called Paint America Love, regarded by some as his best LP, and married former UK beauty queen Francesca Winfield in London.   In the US, he recorded "The Lion Sleeps Tonight", but after a dispute between his manager Stan Polley and Neil Bogart of Buddah, Christie's vocals were removed and replaced by those of the similar-sounding Robert John, whose version became a major hit.  Christie was also peripherally involved in the legal issues around Five Arts Management, a company set up by Polley, which contributed to the suicides of Badfinger members Pete Ham and Tom Evans. 

Christie returned to the United States, and lived for a time in Lake Charles, Louisiana.  In 1974, he tried a new musical style, going country on his album Lou Christie. This album is also known unofficially as Beyond the Blue Horizon after its best known track, a cover of a hit song from 1930 written for the film Monte Carlo.  The song missed the Country charts and only made No. 80 on the pop chart but managed No. 12 on the Adult Contemporary chart. The song has been used in several film soundtracks, including 1988's Rain Man.

In the spring of 1978 Christie returned home to Pittsburgh to head the upstart record Label 2001 records, a branch of the 2001 and VIP nightclubs nationwide. While visiting local friends at the Staircase Lounge, Christie heard a local group, Sweet Breeze, and loved the band's harmonies and music. Christie signed the band Sweet Breeze to their first recording contract and the band recorded a song written by Christie and Herbert called "Summer in Malibu" that was a regional hit for the band.

Christie became active on the oldies circuit starting in the early 1980s, scoring a final US chart hit, credited as "Summer '81 Medley" by The Cantina Band (featuring Lou Christie), in 1981, performing a medley of Beach Boys classics.

In 1986, he recorded a duet with Lesley Gore of a medley of "Since I Don't Have You"/"It's Only Make Believe" for Manhattan Records, a division of EMI-America. The two singers were touring together at the time, and the song was released only as a one-off single.

Christie was credited as special music collaborator on the movie Barcelona, released in 1994. He and Mark Suozzo wrote a song, "Breakin' Up", which Christie performed and which was included in the soundtrack album for the film.

In 1997, Christie recorded his first all-new album since the 1970s, entitled Pledging My Love and produced by Alan Grossman & Jimm Mosher of Hit Music Studio in Spencer, North Carolina. Billboard labeled this new album "Most Impressive Comeback" album. Most of it was penned by Christie, presented in a contemporary manner, and included the songs "What Happened to the Nights", "Techno Pop" (a diatribe about the loss of communication in our lives), and "I Sure Fell in Love" and covers of the Critters' "Mr. Dieingly Sad" and Johnny Ace's title tune. Cub Koda said it was "loaded with AOR hits".

In 2004, Christie released his first concert album, Greatest Hits Live From The Bottom Line, which featured studio recording "Christmas In New York" as a bonus track. In addition to the occasional new release, Christie remains a concert act on the oldies circuit in the US and UK. He has also hosted a series of programs on SiriusXM radio for the 1960s channel. In 2015, Christie released his first new recording in several years, entitled "Drive In Dreams", written by Gregory Scharpf, who is a former member of Sweet Breeze, the Pittsburgh-based band that Christie signed to their first recording contract. His next release was 2016's "When You Were Young", also penned by Scharpf.

Discography

Singles 
{| class="wikitable" style=text-align:center;
|-
!rowspan="2"|Year
!rowspan="2"|Title
!colspan="6"|Peak chart positions
!rowspan="2"|Record Label
!rowspan="2"|B-sideFrom same album as A-side except where indicated
!rowspan="2"|Album
|- style="font-size:smaller;"
!align=centre| US
!align=centre| AC
!align=centre| R&B
!align=centre| UK
!align=centre| CAN
!align=centre| AU
|-
|rowspan="1"| 1962
|align=left| "The Gypsy Cried"
| 24
| —
| —
| —
| —
| —
|rowspan="5"| Roulette Records
| "Red Sails in the Sunset" (Non-LP track)
|rowspan="3"| Lou Christie
|-
|rowspan="3"| 1963
|align=left| "Two Faces Have I"
| 6
| —
| 11
| —
| —
| 20
| "All That Glitters Isn't Gold"
|-
|align=left| "How Many Teardrops"
| 46
| —
| —
| —
| —
| 79
| "You and I (Have a Right to Cry)"
|-
|align=left| "Shy Boy"
| 119
| —
| —
| —
| —
| —
| "It Can Happen"
||Non-LP tracks
|-
|rowspan="3"| 1964
|align=left| "Stay"
| —
| —
| —
| —
| —
| —
| "There They Go" (Non-LP track)
|| Lou Christie
|-
|align=left| "Guitars and Bongos"
| 123
| —
| —
| —
| —
| —
|rowspan="4"| Colpix Records
| "Merry-Go-Round" (Non-LP track)
|rowspan="4"| Lou Christie Strikes Again
|-
|align=left| "Have I Sinned"
| —
| —
| —
| —
| —
| —
| "Pot of Gold"
|-
|rowspan="3"| 1965
|align=left| "Why Did You Do It Baby"
| —
| —
| —
| —
| —
| —
| "Make Summer Last Forever"
|-
|align=left| "A Teenager in Love"
| —
| —
| —
| —
| —
| —
| "Back Track"
|-
|align=left| "Lightnin' Strikes"
| 1
| —
| —
| 11
| 1
| 9
|| MGM Records
| "Cryin' in the Streets"
|| Lightnin' Strikes
|-
|rowspan="6"| 1966
|align=left| "Outside the Gates of Heaven"
| 45
| —
| —
| —
| 32
| —
|| Co & Ce Records
| "All That Glitters Isn't Gold"
||Non-LP tracks
|-
|align=left| "Big Time"
| 95
| —
| —
| —
| —
| —
|| Colpix Records
| "Cryin' on My Knees"
|| Lou Christie Strikes Again
|-
|align=left| "Rhapsody in the Rain"
| 16
| —
| —
| 37
| 10
| 40
|rowspan="4"| MGM Records
| "Trapeze"<small> (from Lightnin' Strikes)
|rowspan="2"| Painter of Hits|-
|align=left| "Painter"
| 81
| —
| —
| —
| 60
| —
| "Du Ronda"
|-
|align=left| "If My Car Could Only Talk"
| 118
| —
| —
| —
| —
| —
| "Song of Lita"
||Non-LP tracks
|-
|align=left| "Since I Don't Have You"
| 118
| —
| —
| —
| 71
| —
| "Wild Life's in Season"
|| Painter of Hits|-
|rowspan="4"| 1967
|align=left| "Shake Hands and Walk Away Cryin'"
| 95
| —
| —
| —
| —
| —
|rowspan="4"| Columbia Records
| "Escape"
|rowspan="6"|Non-LP tracks
|-
|align=left| "Self Expression (The Kids on the Street Will Never Give In)"
| —
| —
| —
| —
| —
| —
| "Back to the Days of the Romans"
|-
|align=left| "Gina"
| —
| —
| —
| —
| —
| —
| "Escape"
|-
|align=left| "Don't Stop Me (Jump Off the Edge of Love)"
| —
| —
| —
| —
| —
| —
| "Back to the Days of the Romans"
|-
|rowspan="2"| 1968
|align=left| "Genesis and the Third Verse"
| —
| —
| —
| —
| —
| —
|rowspan="7"| Buddah Records
| "Rake Up the Leaves"
|-
|align=left| "Canterbury Road"
| —
| —
| —
| —
| —
| —
| "Saints of Aquarius"
|-
|rowspan="2"| 1969
|align=left| "I'm Gonna Make You Mine"
| 10
| —
| —
| 2
| 5
| 28
| "I'm Gonna Get Married"
|rowspan="2"| I'm Gonna Make You Mine|-
|align=left| "Are You Getting Any Sunshine?"
| 73
| —
| —
| —
| 56
| —
| "It'll Take Time"
|-
|rowspan="2"| 1970
|align=left| "Love Is Over"
| —
| —
| —
| —
| —
| —
| "She Sold Me Magic" (from I'm Gonna Make You Mine) (#25 UK) (#7 JP)
|rowspan="2"|Non-LP tracks
|-
|align=left| "Indian Lady"
| 106
| 39
| —
| —
| —
| 89
| "Glory River"
|-
|| 1971
|align=left| "Lighthouse"
| —
| —
| —
| —
| —
| —
| "Waco"
|| Paint America Love|-
|| 1973
|align=left| "Beyond the Blue Horizon"
| 80
| 12
| —
| —
| 57
| —
|rowspan="2"| Three Brothers Records
| "Saddle the Wind"
|rowspan="2"| Lou Christie|-
|| 1974
|align=left| "Good Mornin'/Zip-a-Dee-Doo-Dah"
| —
| —
| —
| —
| —
| —
| "You Were the One"
|-
|| 1975
|align=left| "Summer Days"
| —
| —
| —
| —
| —
| —
|| Slipped Disc Records
| "The One and Only Original Sunshine Kid"
|rowspan="6"|Non-LP tracks
|-
|rowspan="2"| 1976
|align=left| "Riding in My Van"
| —
| —
| —
| —
| —
| —
|| Epic Records
| "Summer in Malibu"
|-
|align=left| "You're Gonna Make Love to Me"
| —
| —
| —
| —
| —
| —
|rowspan="2"| Midland International Records
| "Fantasies"
|-
|| 1977
|align=left| "Spanish Wine"
| —
| —
| —
| —
| —
| —
| "Dancing in the Sand"
|-
|| 1986
|align=left| Lou Christie/Lesley Gore
"Since I Don't Have You"/"It's Only Make Believe"
| —
| —
| —
| —
| —
| —
|rowspan="1"| Manhattan Records
| "Our Love Was Meant To Be"
|-
|| 1990
|align=left| Lou Christie/Pia Zadora
"Don't Knock My Love" (shortVersion)
| —
| —
| —
| —
| —
| —
|rowspan="1"| Midsong Records
| "Don't Knock My Love" (LongVersion)
|}

 Albums Lou Christie (Roulette, 1963)Lou Christie Strikes Again (Colpix, 1964)Lightning Strikes (MGM, 1965)Painter of Hits (MGM, 1966)I'm Gonna Make You Mine (Buddah, 1969)Paint America Love (Buddah, 1971)Lou Christie (Three Brothers, 1974)Lou Christie Does Detroit (51 West, 1982)Pledging My Love (Varese Sarabande, 1997)Greatest Hits Live from the Bottom Line (Varese Sarabande, 2004)The Turquoise Trail (LightningStrikes, 2012)Summer in Malibu (LightningStrikes, 2015)

 Collections Rhapsody in the Grooves: His Finest Recordings 1962–1969 (Raven LP, 1984)EnLightnin'ment—The Best of Lou Christie (Rhino, 1990)Greatest Hits Vol. 1 (LightningStrikes, 1993)Glory River—The Buddah Years 1968–1972 (Sequel, 1994)Beyond The Blue Horizon: More of the Best (Varese Sarabande, 1994)Greatest Hits Vol. 2 (LightningStrikes, 1997)Egyptian Shumba: Singles & Rare Recordings 1962–64 (w/The Tammys) (RPM, 2001)Original Sinner: The Very Best of the MGM Recordings (RPM, 2004)Studio 102 Essentials'' (Studio 102, 2008)

References

External links 
 Official website
 Lou Christie & The Tammys Egyptian Shumba Home Page
 Lou Christie Twitter
 Bio at Yahoo! Music
 Bio at ClassicBands.com
 Lou Christie: Lightning is Still Striking, author – Linda Alexander
 

1943 births
Living people
Buddah Records artists
Colpix Records artists
Columbia Records artists
MGM Records artists
Musicians from Pittsburgh
Roulette Records artists
Singer-songwriters from Pennsylvania
Singers with a three-octave vocal range